Davit Benidze (born 15 February 1991) is a Georgian chess player who received the FIDE title of Grandmaster (GM) in October 2013.

Biography
Benidze repeatedly represented Georgia at the European Youth Chess Championships and World Youth Chess Championships in different age groups, where he won four medals: gold (in 2005, at the European Youth Chess Championship in the U14 age group), silver (in 2001, at the World Youth Chess Championship in the U10 age group) and two bronze (in 2004, at the European Youth Chess Championship in the U14 age group, and in 2009, at the European Youth Chess Championship in the U18 age group). In 2006, he played for Georgia in the World Youth U16 Chess Olympiad and won team silver medal and individual bronze medal. In 2010, in Zürich Davit Benidze won a bronze medal at the World Student Championship.

He is the winner of many international chess tournaments, including winning or first prize or shared first place in the Georgi Tringov memorial in Plovdiv (2012), Kahramanmaraş (2013), Hatay (2013), Bitlis (2013).

In 2008, Benidze was awarded the International Master (IM) title and received the Grandmaster (GM) title five years later.

References

External links
 
 
 

1991 births
Living people
Chess players from Georgia (country)
Chess grandmasters